Aliabad-e Olya may refer to:

Aliabad-e Olya, East Azerbaijan
Aliabad-e Olya, Fars
Aliabad-e Olya, Ilam
Aliabad-e Olya, Kerman
Aliabad-e Olya, Zarand, Kerman Province
Aliabad-e Olya, Kermanshah
Aliabad-e Olya, Kangavar, Kermanshah Province
Aliabad-e Olya, Khuzestan
Aliabad-e Olya, Lorestan
Aliabad-e Olya, Razavi Khorasan
Aliabad-e Olya, South Khorasan

See also
Aliabad-e Bala (disambiguation)